Akuffo (also Akufo) is an Akan language patronymic surname with Akuapem-Akropong origins. Notable people with the Akan surname include:
 Edward Akufo-Addo (1906–1979), lawyer, former Chief Justice and President of Ghana in the Second Republic
Fred Akuffo (1937–1979), Ghanaian soldier, politician, former Head of State of Ghana
Gloria Akuffo, Ghanaian politician and current Attorney-General of Ghana
Nana Akufo-Addo (born 1944), Ghanaian lawyer and current President of Ghana
Ohenewa Akuffo (born 1979), Canadian sport wrestler
Sophia Akuffo, Ghanaian lawyer, judge and Chief Justice of Ghana

See also
Kouffo

Surnames of Ashanti origin
Surnames of Akan origin
Ghanaian surnames